Pedro Delgado is a Spanish professional road bicycle racer.

Pedro Delgado may also refer to:

 Pedro Delgado (Venezuelan footballer)
 Pedro Delgado (Portuguese footballer) (born 1997), Portuguese footballer for Shandong Luneng Taishan
 Pedro Delgado (athlete), Spanish Paralympic athlete
 Pedro Delgado (volleyball) (born 1949), Cuban volleyball player
 Pedro Delgado Campaña, former Governor of the Central Bank of Ecuador
 Pedro Delgado Hernández (born 1956), Puerto Rican attorney and United States District Judge
 Pedro Pérez Delgado (1881–1924), Venezuelan revolutionary and politician

See also 
Delgado, a common Spanish surname